Ophryastes turbinatus is a species in the subfamily Entiminae ("broad-nosed weevils"), in the suborder Polyphaga ("water, rove, scarab, long-horned, leaf and snout beetles").
It is found in North America.

References

Further reading
 Arnett, R.H. Jr., M. C. Thomas, P. E. Skelley and J. H. Frank. (eds.). (2002). American Beetles, Volume II: Polyphaga: Scarabaeoidea through Curculionoidea. CRC Press LLC, Boca Raton, FL.
 Arnett, Ross H. (2000). American Insects: A Handbook of the Insects of America North of Mexico. CRC Press.
 Poole, Robert W., and Patricia Gentili, eds. (1996). "Coleoptera". Nomina Insecta Nearctica: A Check List of the Insects of North America, vol. 1: Coleoptera, Strepsiptera, 41-820.
 Richard E. White. (1983). Peterson Field Guides: Beetles. Houghton Mifflin Company.

Entiminae
Beetles described in 1911